Brigadier General Dr. Jaswant Wadhwani (born 4 November 1945) is a Ghanaian medical doctor and a  retired Senior Army Officer. He was also a former Commanding Officer of the 37 Military Hospital and a lecturer at the University of Ghana Medical School where he lectured Pathology.

Education
Dr. Wadhwani had his secondary education at Achimota School  and proceeded to the University of Ghana Medical School where he was trained as a doctor.

Career
Dr Wadhwani began his career as a doctor at the Korle-Bu Teaching Hospital

Upon his retirement from  the 37 Military Hospital  he was appointed as the medical director of the Police Hospital in Accra

References

Living people
Alumni of Achimota School
1945 births
Ghanaian people of Indian descent
University of Ghana Medical School alumni
Academic staff of the University of Ghana Medical School